The 7th New York Cavalry Regiment, the "Northern Black Horse Cavalry" and more properly designated 1st Regiment New York Mounted Rifles, was a cavalry regiment of the Union Army during the American Civil War.

Service
This regiment was organized at Troy, New York to serve three years. November 18, 1861, it was designated by the State authorities as the 2nd Regiment of Cavalry; by the War Department it was designated 7th N. Y. Volunteer Cavalry, under which designation it was mustered out of service, and was, therefore, so recorded. The companies were mustered in the service of the United States:

 A at Salem, November 6;
 B at Sandy Creek, November 6;
 C, D, E, F and H at Troy, November 6; and G at Elmira, November 8, 1861.

There were only eight companies organized and these were recruited principally:

 A at Salem;
 B at Sandy Creek;
 C at Troy, Hoosick Falls, Schenectady, Berlin, Petersburgh and Grafton;
 D at Troy, Ogdensburgh, Newburgh, Saugerties and Goshen;
 E at Troy, Lowville, Albany and Carthage;
 F at Troy, Ballston, Broadalbin, Gloversville and Mayfield;
 G at Elmira, Lockport and Troy;
 H at Troy, Boonville, Ballston, Schulyerville, Nassau and Pittstown.

The regiment left the State November 23, 1861, and served near Washington, D. C., until March 31, 1862, when, not having been mounted, it was honorably discharged and mustered out.

Total strength and casualties
During its service it lost by death, of disease, seven enlisted men.

Commanders
Colonel Andrew J. Morrison

See also

List of New York Civil War regiments

Notes

References
The Civil War Archive

External links
 Civil War Museum Unit History Project New York State Military Museum and Veterans Research Center - Civil War - 7th Cavalry Regiment Civil War First Mounted Rifles History, photographs, table of battles and casualties, and historical sketch for the 7th Regiment New York Volunteer Cavalry.
 National Park Service The Civil War Regiment Details Union New York Volunteers

Cavalry 007
1861 establishments in New York (state)
Military units and formations established in 1861
Military units and formations disestablished in 1862